Orthopaedic Studio is an application designed to help orthopaedic specialists perform several common quantitative hip examinations that are based on standard x-ray images.

The application is implemented as a plugin for the medical image viewer OsiriX and thereby only runs on Mac OS X.

Orthopaedic Studio evaluates four different types of hip radiographs (standing anteroposterior, Von Rosen, false profile and frog). On such images a number of standardized angles, offsets and ratios can be measured, including:

 Lateral collateral ligament angle
 Tönnis angle
 Joint space width
 Pelvic tilt and rotation
 Anterior centre edge angle
 Femoral head-neck offset ratio
 Frog Alpha angle
 Frog modified Alpha angle for slipped capital femoral epiphysis (SCFE)
 Epiphysis-metaphyseal offset for SCFE
 Southwick angle for SCFE

The following visual scores can also be registered:

 Break in Shenton's line
 Cross-over sign
 Posterior wall sign
 Tönnis classification
 Joint congruity

References

Medical software